Andries Venter is a South African rugby league and rugby union footballer who has played in the 2010s. He has also represented South Africa in rugby league.

References

External links
 Barrow Raiders profile
 (archived by web.archive.org) Kendal RFC profile
 Barrow Raiders sign Venter and Nixon for 2012 season
 Statistics at loverugbyleague.com
 Statistics at rugbyleagueproject.org
 Amateurs give Barrow a real run for their money

1986 births
Barrow Raiders players
Expatriate rugby league players in England
Expatriate rugby union players in England
Living people
Rugby league props
Rugby union props
South African expatriate rugby league players
South African expatriate rugby union players
South African expatriate sportspeople in England
South African rugby league players
South African rugby union players